Košice, the second largest city of Slovakia and largest city of east Slovakia, is divided into four national administrative districts: I, II, III, IV, and into 22 boroughs (literally: city parts, also translated as (city) districts or wards). These boroughs vary in size and population, from the smallest Džungľa and least populated Lorinčík to the largest Košice-Sever and most populated Košice-Západ.

Each of the boroughs has its own mayor and council. The number of councillors in each depends on the size and population of that borough. Mayor and the local council are elected in municipal election every four years. The boroughs are responsible for issues of local significance such as urban planning, local roads maintenance, budget, local ordinances, parks maintenance, safety and so on.

The following table gives an overview of the boroughs, along with the district, population, area, annexation, if applicable and location within Košice.

The following table shows various quarters or localities in the boroughs.

References

Bibliography

External links 

Official website of Košice (in English)
List of boroughs with municipal addresses (Official website of Košice) (in Slovak)
Clickable map of Košice boroughs, with articles on each borough in Slovak (at Cassovia.sk) (in Slovak)

 
Košice